Endre Funnemark (born 25 February 1998) is a Norwegian competitive sailor, born in Oslo. He qualified to represent Norway at the 2020 Summer Olympics in Tokyo 2021, competing in RS:X, where he placed 14th.

Funnemark is affiliated with the Royal Norwegian Yacht Club.

References

External links
 
 
 

1998 births
Living people
Norwegian male sailors (sport)
Olympic sailors of Norway
Sailors at the 2020 Summer Olympics – RS:X
Sportspeople from Oslo
Norwegian windsurfers